The Uthman Taha Quran is a Mus'haf written with the Kufic script by the calligrapher Uthman Taha according to Warsh recitation and other recitations.

Mus'haf description 
The transcription of this Mus'haf was done in accordance with the Warsh recitation which is the main canonical Quranic recitation (Qira'a) or method of reciting the Qur'an practiced in North Africa.

This Mus'haf was written by calligrapher Uthman Taha (born 1934) according to the way of Al-Azraq (1208 – 1276 CE).

This manuscript has been produced on 573 pages, each of them containing 15 lines of verses from the Quran.

Editions
The owners of Al-Dar Al-Shamiya  in Syria owned the rights to print the first copy of the Quran that Uthman Taha wrote for them in 1970.

This Mus'haf was again printed in Medina for the first time, after minor repairs to the first edition of Al-Dar Al-Shamiyya, by the Quran Review Committee, which took permission to reprint from the original Syrian printing press.

Then, starting in the year 1415 AH, the African Mus'haf printing press issued a Quran that spread across the African continent, and appeared in a luxurious and very beautiful garment in Uthman Taha's handwriting as a clone of the first copy of the Al-Dar Al-Shamiya in Syria.

The State of Kuwait also issued the Kuwait Quran, based on the edition of the African Mus'haf, in a beautiful luxurious edition, and by making some slight modifications to some of the control marks.

See also 

 Quran
 Mus'haf
 Warsh recitation
 Ten recitations
 Uthman Taha

References 

Quranic manuscripts
Warsh recitation